Bhadu may refer to:

Bhadu (festival), a social festival of South Bengal, India
Rajendar Singh Bhadu, Indian politician

See also
Bhadua, a village in West Bengal, India